Pediasia ledereri is a moth in the family Crambidae. It was described by Stanisław Błeszyński in 1954. It is found in Central Asia, where it has been recorded from the Altai Mountains.

References

Crambini
Moths described in 1954
Moths of Asia